Angella Dravid (born C. 1985/1986) is a New Zealand stand-up comedian, writer and actress.

Biography
Dravid was born c. 1985/1986 in New Zealand to a Samoan Christian mother and Indian Hindu father. She stated that being from a mixed race, there were many arguments at the family dinner table, like whether to eat meat. She emigrated with her family when they settled into rural South Australia.

Dravid played the violin in high school and met a classical musician in a music chat room. He told her that he had been in the studio where The Spice Girls recorded. She moved to the UK to start a relationship with the man, who was older than her. They married the following year. Their relationship became abusive; aged 19, Dravid was arrested and convicted of assaulting her husband with a picture frame. There was nobody Dravid knew who could bail her out in the UK; she spent two months in prison and three years in a bail hostel, whilst pursuing work at the Royal Ascot racecourse before being deported back to New Zealand and divorcing her husband. Dravid referred to this time as a positive experience compared to the domestic violence in her marriage.

After her deportation Dravid had no intention of pursuing a career in entertainment and worked odd jobs including as a receptionist at a brothel. She initially attended an open mic night to get over her anxiety at working customer service facing jobs and her fear of public speaking and continued to pursue stand-up comedy after her sets were successful.

In 2017, she decided on showbusiness and perhaps writing a drama or serial based on her experiences, this was however upon her choosing turned into a comedy stand-up program, that played the New Zealand International Comedy Festival and turning her thoughts of being in an abusive relationship into a show called Down the Rabbit Hole, which played the New Zealand International Comedy Festival For her performance Dravid won the 2017 Billy T Award, an accolade that recognises up and coming comedy performers.  In 2020 it was announced she was working on adapting the play into a film.

She appeared on the shows Funny Girls and Jono and Ben.

She appeared on the first season of the New Zealand adaptation of Taskmaster which was filmed and aired in 2020. Dravid won the series.

In 2021 she appeared in the TV series Creamerie. In 2023, Dravid appeared on Guy Montgomery's Guy Mont-Spelling Bee.

References

Further reading
 
 
 
 
 
 "Kiwi comedian Angella Dravid opens up about prison experience". Newshub. 29 July 2019.

New Zealand comedians
New Zealand actresses
New Zealand people of Indian descent
New Zealand people of Samoan descent
Year of birth missing (living people)